Song Out of My Trees is an album by Henry Threadgill released on the Black Saint label in 1994.  The album features five of Threadgill's compositions performed by a variety of ensembles that include Threadgill, Ted Daniel, Brandon Ross, Jerome Richardson, James Emery, Ed Cherry, Myra Melford, Tony Cedras, Amina Claudine Myers, Diedre Murray, Michelle Kinney, Gene Lake, and Reggie Nicholson.

Reception
The Allmusic review by Ron Wynn awarded the album 3 stars, stating, "Even a champion of the unorthodox like Threadgill may have some people scratching their heads after they hear this, but it is a signal that he'll never settle for doing what's expected".

Track listing
All compositions by Henry Threadgill
 "Gateway" - 9:24 
 "Over the River Club" - 9:24 
 "Grief" - 10:11 
 "Crea" - 8:47 
 "Song Out of My Trees" - 8:15
Recorded at Sear Sound, New York City on August 17, 18, & 19, 1993

Personnel
Henry Threadgill - alto saxophone (tracks 1, 3 & 5)
Ted Daniel - trumpet (track 1), hunting horns (track 4)
Brandon Ross - guitar (track 1), alto guitar (tracks 2 & 4)
Jerome Harris (originally miscredited as Jerome Richardson) - acoustic bass guitar (track 1), bass guitar (tracks 2 & 4)
James Emery - soprano guitar (tracks 2 & 4)
Ed Cherry - guitar (tracks 2, 4 & 5)
Myra Melford - piano (track 2)
Tony Cedras - accordion (track 3)
Amina Claudine Myers - harpsichord (track 3), organ (track 5)
Diedre Murray, Michelle Kinney - cello (track 3)
Gene Lake - drums (track 1)
Reggie Nicholson - drums (track 5)
Mossa Bildner - vocals (track 3)

References

1994 albums
Henry Threadgill albums
Black Saint/Soul Note albums